Marco Antonio Battaglia (born January 25, 1973) is a former American football tight end in the National Football League who played for five different teams.  Battaglia played college football at Rutgers University and was recognized as an All-American.  He was chosen in second round of the 1996 NFL Draft by the Cincinnati Bengals, and he played professionally for the Bengals, Washington Redskins, Pittsburgh Steelers, Tampa Bay Buccaneers and Carolina Panthers of the NFL.

Early years
Battaglia was born in Howard Beach, New York.  He attended St. Francis Preparatory School in Queens, New York, and played high school football for the St. Francis Terriers.

College career
He attended Rutgers University in New Jersey, where he played for the Rutgers Scarlet Knights football team from 1992 to 1995.  As a senior in 1995, he was recognized as a consensus first-team All-American at tight end for the Scarlet Knights.

Professional career
In eight NFL seasons, Battaglia played in ninety-six games and started eleven of them, and compiled seventy-one receptions, 660 receiving yards and two touchdown receptions.

Personal life
Battaglia currently lives in Middle Village, New York, with his family. He is a friend and occasional personal trainer of radio host Howard Stern. In March 2002, he broke Howard's thumb when he accidentally dropped some weights on it.

References

Living people
1973 births
All-American college football players
American football tight ends
Carolina Panthers players
Cincinnati Bengals players
Pittsburgh Steelers players
Rutgers Scarlet Knights football players
Sportspeople from Queens, New York
Players of American football from New York City
St. Francis Preparatory School alumni
Tampa Bay Buccaneers players
Washington Redskins players
People from Howard Beach, Queens